Koziegłowy may refer to the following places in Poland: 
Koziegłowy, Silesian Voivodeship, a town in south Poland
Koziegłowy, Greater Poland Voivodeship, an urbanized village adjoining Poznań (west-central Poland)
Koziegłowy, Grójec County in Masovian Voivodeship (east-central Poland)
Koziegłowy, Pułtusk County in Masovian Voivodeship (east-central Poland)
Koziegłowy, Konin County in Greater Poland Voivodeship (west-central Poland)